Hans Axel Tammo Graf von Schwerin-Löwitz  (19 May 1847, Löwitz – 4 November 1918) was a German politician for German Conservative Party and officer.

Biography
Until 1881, Hans Graf von Schwerin-Löwitz was an active officer (Rittmeister) and Flügeladjutant in Saxony.  He then managed his own manor, was an Okrajnega Representative beginning in 1901, President of the Prussian country's economy College and was a member of the German Agriculture Council in 1896 as Chairman of the Chamber of Agriculture for Bezirkseisenbahnrat and Pomerania.

From March 1910 to February 1912, he was President of the German Reichstag.  He had earlier served there as deputy starting in 1893. From 1896, he was a representative of the constituency of Stettin 1 in the Prussian House of Representatives, and from 1912 to 1918 he became the President.

Schwerin-Löwitz then became a member of the Bimetallisten Committee of the German Reichstag.  During the First World War, he represented the Confederation of Farmers on the Board of Trustees of the imperial grain body.

Legacy
A preserved steam locomotive on the Brecon Mountain Railway in Wales carries his name, "Graf Schwerin-Löwitz".

References

1847 births
1918 deaths
People from Vorpommern-Greifswald
People from the Province of Pomerania
Hans
German Protestants
German Conservative Party politicians
Members of the 9th Reichstag of the German Empire
Members of the 10th Reichstag of the German Empire
Members of the 11th Reichstag of the German Empire
Members of the 12th Reichstag of the German Empire
Members of the 13th Reichstag of the German Empire